Gonada is a moth genus of the family Depressariidae.

Species
 Gonada cabima Busck, 1912
 Gonada falculinella Busck, 1911
 Gonada flavidorsis Meyrick, 1930
 Gonada phosphorodes Meyrick, 1922
 Gonada pyronota Meyrick, 1924
 Gonada rubens Meyrick, 1916

References

 
Depressariinae